Schœlcher is a town and the fourth-largest commune in the French overseas department of Martinique. The town was named Case-Navire until 1889, when it was renamed in honor of French abolitionist writer Victor Schœlcher.

Geography
It is located on the west (Caribbean Sea) side of the island of Martinique, and is part of the metropolitan area of Fort-de-France, the largest metropolitan area in Martinique.

Population

See also
Communes of Martinique

References

External links

 Official website 
 

 
Communes of Martinique
Populated places in Martinique